James Sharrock (24 October 1882 – 16 February 1945) was an English professional rugby league footballer who played in the 1900s and 1910s.
 In 1917 he joined the Wigan board of directors, and was later a secretary-manager for Rochdale Hornets.

Background
Sharrock was born in Aspull, Wigan, Lancashire, England, and he died aged 62 in Aspull, Wigan, Lancashire, England.

Playing career

International honours
Sharrock won caps for England while at Wigan in 1910 against Wales, and in 1911 against Australia, and won caps for Great Britain while at Wigan on the 1910 Great Britain Lions tour of Australia and New Zealand against Australia (2 matches), Australasia (2 matches), and New Zealand, and in 1911–12 against Australia.

Championship final appearances
Sharrock played  in Wigan's 7–3 victory over Oldham in the Championship Final during the 1908–09 season at The Willows, Salford on Saturday 1 May 1909.

County League appearances
Sharrock played in Wigan's victories in the Lancashire County League during the 1908–09 season, 1910–11 season, 1911–12 season and 1912–13 season.

County Cup Final appearances
Sharrock played , and scored a goal in Wigan's 10–9 victory over Oldham in the 1908 Lancashire County Cup Final during the 1908–09 season at Wheater's Field, Broughton, on Saturday 19 December 1908, played  in the 22–5 victory over Leigh in the 1909 Lancashire County Cup Final during the 1909–10 season at Wheater's Field, Broughton, on Saturday 27 November 1909, and played , and scored 2-goals in the 21–5 victory over Rochdale Hornets in the 1912 Lancashire County Cup Final during the 1912–13 season at Weaste, Salford, on Wednesday 11 December 1912.

Notable tour matches
Sharrock played  in Wigan's 12–8 victory over New Zealand in the 1907–1908 New Zealand rugby tour of Australia and Great Britain match at Central Park, Wigan, on Saturday 9 November 1907, in the 10–7 victory over Australia in the 1908–09 Kangaroo tour of Great Britain match at Central Park, Wigan, on Saturday 9 January 1909, played , and scored a goal in the 16–8 victory over Australia in the 1908–09 Kangaroo tour of Great Britain match at Central Park, Wigan, on Wednesday 20 January 1909, and played  in the 7–2 victory over Australia in the 1911–12 Kangaroo tour of Great Britain match at Central Park, Wigan, on Saturday 28 October 1911.

References

External links
Statistics at wigan.rlfans.com

1882 births
1945 deaths
England national rugby league team players
English rugby league players
Great Britain national rugby league team players
People from Aspull
Rugby league players from Wigan
Rugby league fullbacks
Wigan Warriors players